Edward Thomas McCaffrey, Jr. (born August 17, 1968) is an American football coach and former wide receiver who played in the National Football League (NFL) for thirteen seasons. McCaffrey played college football for Stanford University and earned first-team All-American honors. The New York Giants chose him in the third round of the 1991 NFL Draft. He also played for the San Francisco 49ers and Denver Broncos. He served as the head coach of the Northern Colorado Bears football team from 2020–2022.

High school career
McCaffrey was born in Waynesboro, Pennsylvania and played high school football at Allentown Central Catholic High School in Allentown, where he competed in the Eastern Pennsylvania Conference. McCaffrey was also a standout basketball player for Allentown Central Catholic High School, leading the school to state titles in 1984 and 1986.

College career
He played college football at Stanford University.  McCaffrey finished his football career as Stanford's 5th all time leader in receptions (146) and third in receiving yards (2,333). He earned first-team All-America and All-Pac-10 Conference honors as a senior in 1990 after catching 61 passes for 917 yards and eight touchdowns. McCaffrey was enshrined in Stanford's athletic Hall of Fame in 1990. At Stanford, he was a member of the Sigma Alpha Epsilon fraternity.

Professional career

McCaffrey was selected by the Giants in the third round (83rd overall) in the 1991 NFL draft. During his thirteen-year career, he won three Super Bowl rings (Super Bowl XXIX, as a 49er; XXXII and XXXIII, as a Bronco) and made a Pro Bowl appearance in 1998.  In Denver, he became a reliable target for quarterback John Elway, set a Broncos record for most receptions in a season at the time (with 101 receptions in 2000), and had an exceptional performance in Super Bowl XXXIII, recording five catches for 72 yards. Also in 2000, McCaffrey and teammate Rod Smith became only the second wide receiver duo from the same team to each gain 100 receptions in the same season (see Herman Moore and Brett Perriman).

In the opening game of the Broncos' 2001 season, McCaffrey suffered a leg fracture while playing a Monday Night Football game with the Broncos against the Giants. He rebounded in the 2002 season with 69 receptions and 903 yards. Hampered by injuries during a disappointing 2003 season, McCaffrey retired on February 29, 2004. He finished his career with 565 career receptions for 7,422 yards along with 55 touchdowns.

NFL career statistics

Coaching career

Valor Christian High School
McCaffrey was named the head football coach at Valor Christian High School in February 2018.

Northern Colorado
On December 12, 2019, the University of Northern Colorado hired McCaffrey as head football coach.  He was fired from the position on November 21, 2022.

Head coaching record

Life after football
McCaffrey began coaching youth football camps in the summer of 2000. In 2011, he founded SportsEddy, which includes not just football but lacrosse, soccer, baseball and basketball camps. The Ed McCaffrey "Dare to Play" football camp and the "Dare to Cheer" cheerleading camp for individuals with Down syndrome are produced in partnership with the Global Down Syndrome Foundation. McCaffrey also founded the McCaffrey Family Foundation with wife Lisa, to assist children whose medical situation has created an academic or financial hardship.

He also has his own brand of mustard and horseradish sauce, which can be found in supermarkets across Colorado and into Nebraska.  On July 30, 2012, McCaffrey was named the new color analyst for 850 KOA, flagship station of the Denver Broncos Radio Network, replacing Brian Griese. On January 7, 2019, it was announced he would serve as the commissioner of the Pacific Pro Football league, a planned professional development football league founded by Don Yee.

Personal life

McCaffrey is the oldest of five children, with two brothers and two sisters: Monica (who played basketball at Georgetown University), Billy (who played basketball at Duke University and Vanderbilt University), Michael, and Meghan.

McCaffrey met his wife, Lisa (Sime), daughter of Olympic sprinter Dave Sime, while they both attended Stanford University. Together, they have four sons, all of whom have played football.

Their eldest, Max, was a wide receiver who played college football at Duke. He was on the rosters of several different NFL teams from 2016–2018, and served as the Offensive Coordinator at Northern Colorado under his father.

Christian McCaffrey was a four-star running back for the Valor Eagles between 2010 and 2014. During that time, he also played wide receiver, cornerback and punter. He broke numerous Colorado high school records including career total touchdowns (141), career all purpose yards (8,845), career touchdown receptions (47), and single season all-purpose yards (3,032). He was the Gatorade Football Player of the Year for Colorado in both 2012 and 2013. He also played basketball. He was a running back for the Stanford Cardinal between 2014, 2015 and 2016, and was the runner-up for the 2015 Heisman Trophy against Alabama's Derrick Henry in the 2015 voting. He left school a year early after the 2016 season and was drafted with the eighth pick in the first round of the 2017 NFL Draft by the Carolina Panthers. Christian was later traded to the San Francisco 49ers in the middle of the 2022-2023 season, following in his dad’s footsteps once again. 

Dylan McCaffrey was a four-star quarterback for Valor Christian who graduated in 2017.  His team won the Colorado Class 5A state championship (5A being the highest of the five classes) in three of the four years he played. As the second-ranked quarterback in the country and top-ranked quarterback in Colorado, Dylan received scholarship offers from Duke, Colorado, Rutgers, LSU, Michigan, Washington, UCLA, Colorado State and Penn State. He committed to play college football at Michigan in February 2016. In January 2021, he announced his transfer to Northern Colorado.

The youngest son, Luke McCaffrey, graduated Valor Christian in May 2019. He received an offer from Michigan, along with an offer from Nebraska. He committed to Nebraska in June 2018. In February 2021, he announced he was transferring to the University of Louisville. On June 9, 2021, he re-entered the transfer portal, and on June 14, he announced that he was transferring to Rice University.

References

External links

 EdMcCaffrey.com
 SportsEddy.com
 

1968 births
Living people
American football wide receivers
Denver Broncos announcers
Denver Broncos players
High school football coaches in Colorado
New York Giants players
National Football League announcers
Northern Colorado Bears football coaches
San Francisco 49ers players
Stanford Cardinal football players
All-American college football players
American Conference Pro Bowl players
Allentown Central Catholic High School alumni
Sportspeople from Allentown, Pennsylvania
Coaches of American football from Pennsylvania
Players of American football from Pennsylvania
Ed Block Courage Award recipients